Delfinium Prints is a German independent publisher specialised on comics. It was founded by David Füleki and Roy Seyfert in 2008.

Publications (selection)

Comics 
 78 Tage auf der Straße des Hasses
 Grablicht
 Chicken King
 Rasselbande Adventures
 Suburbia Highschool
 Super Epic Brawl Omega
 Patina
 Go in and win

Other products 
 T-shirts
 Posters
 Postcards
 Buttons
 Trading cards

External links 

 
Comic book publishing companies of Germany
Comics by David Füleki
Publishing companies established in 2008
German companies established in 2008